Emmett Reuben Hicks (March 7, 1854 – October 27, 1925) was an American lawyer.

Born in Waukau, Wisconsin, Hicks received his bachelor's degree and law degrees from University of Wisconsin–Madison and practiced law in Oshkosh, Wisconsin. He served as Wisconsin Attorney General 1899–1903 as a Republican.

Hicks died in Oshkosh when he was run over twice by the same car while crossing the street.

References

1854 births
1925 deaths
Politicians from Oshkosh, Wisconsin
People from Waukau, Wisconsin
University of Wisconsin–Madison alumni
University of Wisconsin Law School alumni
Wisconsin Republicans
Wisconsin Attorneys General